Fiľakovo is a town in the Banská Bystrica Region of south-central Slovakia. Historically it was located in Nógrád County, as part of the Nógrád, Novohrad, "Newcastle" region.

Geography

History
The first written record of the town, along with the Fiľakovo Castle is from 1242, where the castle withstood the Mongol invasions. It is mentioned in 1246 as Filek. In 1423 the town received municipal privileges. In 1553 the town with the castle was conquered by the Turks and was the seat of a sanjak until 1593, when it was reconquered by the Imperial troops. However, it was conquered once more by the Ottomans in 1662 and the town along with the castle was burned down in 1682 by troops of Imre Thököly. It was finally passed to Austrians in 1686. After the Treaty of Trianon in 1920 came under the rule of Czechoslovakia. It belonged to Hungary again in years 1938–1945 after the First Vienna Award.

Demographics
According to the 2001 census, ethnic groups included 64.40% Hungarians, 30.19% Slovaks, and 4.03% Roma. The religion make-up was as follows: 77.52% Roman Catholic, 11.82% without denomination, 3.21% not specified and others.

Twin towns — sister cities

Fiľakovo is twinned with:

 Bátonyterenye, Hungary
 Salgótarján, Hungary
 Szécsény, Hungary
 Szigethalom, Hungary
 Ustrzyki Dolne, Poland

People

 Sándor Büchler, rabbi, historian
 Frank Lowy,  Australian businessman
 Allan Vilhan, musician
 Vica Kerekes, actress

Gallery

See also
 List of municipalities and towns in Slovakia

References

Genealogical resources

The records for genealogical research are available at the state archive "Statny Archiv in Banska Bystrica, Slovakia"

 Roman Catholic church records (births/marriages/deaths): 1700-1893 (parish A)
 Lutheran church records (births/marriages/deaths): 1783-1895 (parish B)
 Reformated church records (births/marriages/deaths): 1800-1895 (parish B)

External links
 Official website
 Surnames of living people in Filakovo

Cities and towns in Slovakia
Hungarian communities in Slovakia